The Schweninger Building (also known as the Carmel Bakery) is a historic mixed-use commercial building in Carmel-by-the-Sea, California. It was built in 1906, by Artie Bowen for Fritz Schweninger. It is an example of Vernacular style. The structure is recognized as an important commercial building in the city's Downtown Conservation District Historic Property Survey, and was nominated and submitted to the California Register of Historical Resources on July 25, 2002. The building has been occupied by the Carmel Bakery since 1906.

History

The Schweninger Building, (sometimes spelled Schweinger), is a two-story false front Victorian wood frame commercial Vernacular-style building on Ocean Avenue between Dolores and Lincoln Streets in Carmel-by-the-Sea, California. Artie Bowen constructed the building in 1906 for Fritz Seraphin Schweninger (1867-1918). 

The building has vertical board and batten siding on the upper story with two bay windows with a shingled hipped roof. The ground floor has a large bay showcase display window with two doors, one leading to the upper floor and the second, a Dutch door that leads to the bakery. The original owner, Fritz Schweninger, lived in the apartment above the bakery for many years. The overall details of the building are similar to those found in photographs of 1910-1920.

In 1908, a photograph shows the Schweninger Building's Bakery was between the Leidig brothers' grocery market and Louis Slevin's general merchandise store. The bakery was successful, but in September 1917, the Schweninger announced they would close the business to spend more time with a grocery business they had acquired two lots west of the bakery. The bakery sat vacant throughout 1918-1919 and reopened as the Carmel Bakery in April 1920 under a lease to Carl Husemann. The building was leased to several other people who ran the bakery. The Schweninger heirs sold the building to Charles and Doris Rayne in 1963. Rich Pèpe family bought the bakery building from the Rayne family in 2013.

The building qualifies for inclusion in the city's Downtown Conservation District Historic Property Survey, and has been nominated and submitted to the California Register of Historical Resources on  July 25, 2002, by Richard N. Janick. The property is significant under the California Register criterion 3, in architecture, as one of two wood frame commercial building still remaining on the south side of Ocean Avenue, with two second story false-front window bays, that date back to the 1910s. The building has housed a commercial bakery since it was established by Fritz Seraphin Schweninger in 1906. The other building of similar design is the Adam Fox Building located two blocks to the east of Ocean Avenue. The two buildings are the oldest buildings before the incorporation of Carmel-by-the-Sea in 1916.

Several additions and remodelings took place over the years. In 1920, an addition to the rear of the building was done for $2.000. A new store front was done by  Michael J. Murphy in 1939 for $500. In 1960, contractor Ben Logan architect Elston & Cranston did an addition to the rear bakery kitchen for $17,000. In 1964, a new store front for the bakery was done by contractor Comstock & Associates for $1,000. A remodel of the front interior showcase was done in 1968 for $3,000.

Ernest Schweninger

Ernest Seraphin Schweninger (1892–1957) was born on September 9, 1892, in San Jose, California. His father was Fritz Seraphin Schweninger (1867-1918) from Germany, and mother was Helen M. Harmon (1869-1918) from Maine. He had one brother, George W. Ernest was married to Carol Virginia Walker (1899-1989). 

His parents moved to Carmel in 1906 to open the first bakery. His father, Fritz, was friends with pioneer real estate developer Frank Devendorf. Ernest was an eighth grade graduate in the Monterey School on June 30, 1906.

In 1915, his parents acquired two lots west of the bakery, on Ocean Avenue, and opened the Carmel Grocery store. During his early years he worked in the grocery store and acted in plays with Herbert Heron. He was in Heron's comedy play Immortal Fame on February 26, 1915, at the Carmel Arts and Crafts Club. He also acted in July 1917 in the play Androcles and the Lion, at the Forest Theater, as well as other plays in the 1920s.

On May 1, 1918, during World War I, Ernest was recruited at the  Fort McDowell on Angle Island in San Francisco and was stationed with the United States Navy at Mare Island. On May 17, 1918, both his parents died in an automobile accident at the summit of Carmel Hill. A Memorial service was held at were held at the All Saints Church in Monterey. 

Schweninger died of a heart attack at his home, on November 11, 1957, in Monterey County, California, at the age of 65. Funeral services were held in the Little Chapel-by-the-Sea and interment was at the El Carmelo Cemetery, in Pacific Grove, California.

See also
List of Historic Buildings in Carmel-by-the-Sea

References

External links

 Downtown Conservation District Historic Property Survey

1906 establishments in California
Carmel-by-the-Sea, California
Buildings and structures in Monterey County, California